Fibrocapsa is a genus of algae belonging to the family Fibrocapsaceae.

Species:
 Fibrocapsa japonica S.Toriumi & H.Takano

References

Ochrophyta
Heterokont genera